My Son is a 2007 South Korean film written and directed by Jang Jin, starring Cha Seung-won and Ryu Deok-hwan. For his performance, Cha won Best Actor at the 15th Chunsa Film Art Awards in 2007.

Alternate titles are A Day with My Son and One Day with My Son.

Plot
Lee Gang-sik (Cha Seung-won) is serving a life sentence for robbery and murder. For the last 15 years, he has been on his best behavior, and now his wish has finally come true. Gang-sik has been granted a one-day leave to visit his family, and as the day draws closer and closer, he is overcome with both excitement and nervousness. There is so much he wants to say to his eighteen-year-old son Jun-seok (Ryu Deok-hwan), whom he hasn't seen since incarceration when the boy was three years old, but the feeling isn't exactly reciprocated. Forced to grow up at an early age, his son has had a tough life, taking care of his elderly grandmother with dementia on his own, and in his eyes, he sees not a father, but a stranger, a criminal. How can Gang-sik make up for 15 years with just one day's time? But the father's genuine feelings gradually open his son's heart. To enjoy every second given to them, the father and son hang out together all night until they must once again part ways the next morning.

Cast
Cha Seung-won as Lee Gang-sik
Ryu Deok-hwan as Lee Jun-seok
Kim Ji-young as Gang-sik's mother
Lee Sang-hoon as Prison officer Park
Lee Mun-su as Warden
Lee Han-wi as Priest
Kong Ho-suk as Prisoner
Lee Chul-min as Prisoner
Jin Won as Jin-seok
Kim Yoon-hye as Mimi
Seo Woo as Yeo-il
Jang Young-nam as Corrections officer
Jang Jae-seok
Kim Hak-gyu
Bae Seong-il
Kim Hyeon-jun
Jung Jae-young as Father goose (voice cameo)
Yoon Yoo-sun as Mother goose (voice cameo)
Gong Hyo-jin as Daughter goose (voice cameo)
Shin Ha-kyun as Uncle goose (voice cameo)
Yoo Hae-jin as Man next door (voice cameo)

References

External links 
 
 
 

2007 films
2007 drama films
South Korean drama films
Films directed by Jang Jin
Cinema Service films
2000s South Korean films
2000s Korean-language films